United States Naval Forces Central Command (NAVCENT) is the United States Navy element of United States Central Command (USCENTCOM). Its area of responsibility includes the Red Sea, Gulf of Oman, Persian Gulf, and Arabian Sea. It consists of the United States Fifth Fleet and several other subordinate task forces, including Combined Task Force 150, Combined Task Force 158 and others.

Navy Persian Gulf operations 1945–1971
On 20 January 1948, Commander-in-Chief, Northeastern Atlantic and Mediterranean, Admiral Conolly, created Task Force 126 to supervise the large number of Navy fleet oilers and chartered tankers picking up oil in the Persian Gulf. By June 1949, the Task Force had become Persian Gulf Forces and on 16 August 1949 Persian Gulf Forces became Middle East Force.

In October 1948, Hydrographic Survey Group 1 arrived to help map the Persian Gulf's waters.

In 1971, when Bahrain achieved full independence, the U.S. Navy leased part of the former British base , originally established in 1935. It was renamed it Administrative Support Unit, Bahrain. The name was changed to Naval Support Activity Bahrain in 1999, to reflect its broader support role.

Naval Forces Central Command from 1983
The command was established on 1 January 1983 along with the rest of U.S. Central Command, and command of NAVCENT was initially given to a flag officer selectee based at Pearl Harbor and tasked with coordinating administrative and logistical support for U.S. naval forces in the Persian Gulf. Rear Admiral (lower half) Stan Arthur, the first ComUSNAVCENT, served simultaneously as the Commander-in-Chief, Pacific Fleet, Plans Officer during his first year in the position. An actual flag officer deployed to the region known as Commander, Middle East Force (COMMIDEASTFOR), retained operational control of U.S. naval forces in the Persian Gulf and effectively served as USCENTCOM's de facto naval component commander.

Following the initial establishment of U.S. Central Command, the boundary between USCENTCOM and U.S. Pacific Command (USPACOM) was the Strait of Hormuz. To direct forces of multiple services operating over the boundary, Joint Task Force Middle East was established on 20 September 1987. It was soon obvious that JTF-ME and the Middle East Force were directing much the same operations, and a single dual-hatted naval commander, Commander, Middle Eastern Force (COMMIDEASTFOR), was appointed by February 1988. U.S. Naval Forces Central Command took part in Operation Earnest Will in 1986–1987 and supported Army special operations helicopters conducting Operation Prime Chance. Operation Praying Mantis followed later.

In August 1990, Captain Robert Sutton USN, who had been selected for promotion to rear admiral (lower half), was serving as ComUSNAVCENT. The first Central Command operations order for Desert Shield, issued on 10 August 1990, reflected the Pearl Harbor/MIDEASTFOR split and split the tasks between the two organisations, but, 'most likely,' Pokrant writes, 'Schwarzkopf had already decided to do things differently.' As Pokrant recounts, in a meeting on 6 August 1990, the Central Command plans chief, Rear Admiral Grant Sharp, had advised Schwarzkopf to have a [numbered] fleet commander assigned to CENTCOM to control the extensive naval forces that would deploy. Schwarzkopf discussed the issue with Commander-in-Chief, Pacific Command, Admiral Huntington Hardisty. It was agreed that the Commander, U.S. Seventh Fleet (COMSEVENTHFLT) staff, under Vice Admiral Hank Mauz, would be despatched to command in the Middle East and, tentatively, the Commander, U.S. Third Fleet staff would be earmarked to replace them in six months.

Mauz, his staff, and his flagship, were all located at Yokosuka, Japan, their normal homeport.
To speed the process of taking over command, Mauz obtained permission from Hardisty to fly immediately to Diego Garcia aboard a VIP-configured P-3 Orion, 'Peter Rabbit,' with key members of his staff. The rest of the command group would steam to the Persian Gulf aboard Blue Ridge. When Mauz was cleared to proceed from Diego Garcia to Bahrain, he expected to land and have some days to familiarise himself with the situation before taking over command of NAVCENT from Rear Admiral William M. Fogarty. However, on landing he found a message from Schwarzkopf ordering him to assume command immediately.

After arrival in-theatre in late 1990, Vice Admiral Henry H. Mauz "retained the Middle East Force, designated CTG 150.1 [Commander Task Group 150.1], for most warfighting functions inside the Persian Gulf. Under this hat, Rear Admiral Fogarty would control only the half-dozen ships or so of the Middle East Force, augmented by the battleship Wisconsin when it arrived. Under a second hat, CTG 150.2, Fogarty would be the commander of the U.S. Maritime Interception Force. For this job, his authority would extend outside the Persian Gulf to ships operating in the North Arabian Sea and Red Sea, but only for interception operations." The CVBGs in the North Arabian Sea and Red Sea were designated Task Groups 150.4 and 150.5 respectively; the Amphibious and Landing Forces were CTG 150.6 and CTG 150.8 (Major General Jenkins). Rear Admiral Stephen S. Clarey was Commander U.S. Maritime Prepositioning Force, Commander Task Group 150.7 (CTG 150.7), with the equipment for the U.S. Marine Corps aboard. After the ships had disembarked the Marine equipment in Saudi Arabia, CTG 150.7 was disestablished on 12 September 1990.

From 1 January 1991, the six carriers deployed were divided into Battle Force Yankee (two carriers, including Saratoga, in the Red Sea under Rear Admiral Riley Mixson, Commander, Carrier Group Two/Task Force 155) and Task Force 154, Battle Force Zulu (four carriers in the Arabian Sea/Persian Gulf under Rear Admiral Daniel P. March, Commander, Carrier Group Five). TF 150 was Vice Admiral Henry H. Mauz, Jr. himself, TF 151 the Middle East Force, now including , TG 150.3 Naval Logistics Support Force (Rear Admiral Bob Sutton), and TF 156 the amphibious force.

Since ComUSNAVCENT operated from on board ship, he established NAVCENT-Riyadh as a staff organization to provide continuous Navy representation at CENTCOM headquarters. This mission was assigned initially to Commander, Carrier Group Three (COMCARGRU 3). During succeeding months, the NAVCENT-Riyadh staff was augmented substantially but remained small, relative to the ARCENT and CENTAF staffs. In November, the NAVCENT-Riyadh command was transferred from COMCARGRU 3 to Commander, Cruiser-Destroyer Group 5. This change resulted in the Navy flag officer at NAVCENT Riyadh's remaining relatively junior to other Service representatives, particularly CENTAF. This imbalance in size and seniority between the Navy and other staffs, coupled with the geographic separation with NAVCENT headquarters, made it difficult for NAVCENT-Riyadh to represent the interests of the Navy in the overall coordination and planning efforts.

On 24 April 1991, Vice Admiral Stan Arthur turned over command of NAVCENT to Rear Admiral Ray Taylor, Fogerty's replacement as Commander, Middle East Force, and Arthur and Blue Ridge began their voyage back to the Pacific. Two months earlier, Rear Admiral Taylor had submitted thoughts on the reorientation of the NAVCENT command structure to Schwarzkopf following an earlier direction from Admiral Arthur. The proposal, which was modified in the staffing process, eventually meant that the one-staff ComUSNAVCENT in Hawaii was upgraded to a two-star appointment co-located with Central Command headquarters in Tampa, Florida. Rear Admiral David Rogers became the first two-star Navy representative in Tampa when he relieved Rear Admiral Sutton.

Although COMSEVENTHFLT held command responsibility during this period, no numbered fleet existed permanently within the USCENTCOM area of responsibility during the first Gulf War and for the next four years thereafter. By July 1995, a new numbered fleet was deemed necessary by the senior U.S. Navy leadership, and after a 48-year hiatus, the U.S. Fifth Fleet was reactivated, replacing COMMIDEASTFOR. Dual-hatted as COMUSNAVCENT as the naval component command of USCENTCOM, the same Vice Admiral (and his staff) as Commander, U.S. Fifth Fleet (COMFIFTHFLT) now directs naval operations in the Persian Gulf, Red Sea, and the Arabian Sea. The combined COMUSNAVCENT/COMFIFTHFLT headquarters is located at NSA Bahrain in Manama, Bahrain.  The command oversees both afloat and shore-based units that rotationally deploy or surge from the United States, plus a few smaller surface ships that are based in the Gulf for longer periods. Ships rotationally deploy to the U.S. Fifth Fleet from the Pacific and Atlantic Fleets.

From 2010 through 2013, the U.S. maintained two aircraft carriers east of Suez, known as a "2.0 carrier presence," although it sometimes temporarily dipped below that level. The heightened presence aimed to provide air and sea striking power for U.S. operations in Iraq and Afghanistan and also to deter Iran from bad behavior in the region and keep the Strait of Hormuz open.

On 1 December 2018, NAVCENT commander Vice Admiral Scott A. Stearney was found dead in his residence in Bahrain. No foul play was suspected. Rear Admiral Paul J. Schlise assumed interim command. Vice Admiral Jim Malloy flew to Bahrain to take command.

Combined Maritime Forces

In February 2002 the Combined Maritime Forces was also established as an embedded activity to provide coordinated Coalition operations in the area of operations. It is an international naval partnership that provides security for civilian maritime traffic by conducting counter-piracy and counter-terrorism missions in the heavily trafficked waters of the Middle East, Africa and South Asia, including the Red Sea, the Persian Gulf, the Gulf of Aden, Arabian Sea and the wider Indian Ocean.

CMF's personnel and ships are drawn from 33 nations and are organised into four principal task forces:

 Combined Task Force 150 (CTF-150) – Maritime Security & Counter-terrorism
 Combined Task Force 151 (CTF-151) – Counter-piracy
 Combined Task Force 152 (CTF-152) – Persian Gulf Security Cooperation
 Combined Task Force 153 (CTF-153) – Red Sea Maritime Security

After the September 11 terrorist attacks on the United States, Commander, Task Force 150, previously a single-nation U.S. formation, was made into a multinational effort as Combined Task Force 150 (HOA MIO Force), and was given a renewed focus on maritime security and counter-terrorism. It was established on 3 February 2002, by Vice Admiral Charles W. Moore. Over time, it became increasingly involved in combating the rising incidence of piracy in Somalia.

Combined Task Force 151 was established in January 2009 by Vice Admiral William E. Gortney specifically to address counter-piracy operations.

Operating alongside CTF 151 and Operation Ocean Shield are other national deployments such as the People's Liberation Army Navy, most recently with "CTF 526" aboard the Type 054 frigate Wenzhou (which had the hull number 526).

Combined Task Force 153 was established in April 2022 by Vice Admiral Brad Cooper with a mission of maritime security and capacity building efforts in the Red Sea, Bab al-Mandeb, and Gulf of Aden. Captain Robert Francis was designated the first CTF-153 commander.

List of commanders

References

Further reading
W. Seth Carus, Barry McCoy, and John R. Hafey, From MIDEASTFOR to Fifth Fleet: Forward Naval Presence in Southwest Asia, Alexandria, VA, Center for Naval Analyses, 1995

Commands of the United States Navy
Military units and formations established in 1983